Årefjällsloppet is a Swedish long-distance cross country race which in 2013 is the final of the long distance cup Ski Classics. The first edition was held on 23 March 2013, and was 75 km classic technique.

Winners

References 

Ski marathons
2013 establishments in Sweden
Recurring sporting events established in 2013
March sporting events
Cross-country skiing competitions in Sweden
Sport in Åre